Amnesia Love is a Filipino love story comedy film written and directed by Albert Langitan, starring Paolo Ballesteros and Yam Concepcion. The film was produced by Viva Films a subsidiary of Viva Entertainment. The film was released in the Philippines on  February 28, 2018.

Cast

Plot
Paolo Ballesteros as a gay guy meets an accident and gets washed up in a remote island. He also trying to discover his true identity after being found unconscious in a remote island. When he wakes up he does not remember anything, including his gender orientation. He spends a few weeks in the island where he develops a romance with a barrio lass, until his boyfriend is able to locate him and everything is revealed to him.

References

External links

Filipino-language films
Viva Films films
Cross-dressing in film
Philippine LGBT-related films
2018 LGBT-related films
LGBT-related comedy films